Gray-Brownlow-Wilcox House, also known as La Vallee, is a historic plantation house located at Aurelian Springs, Halifax County, North Carolina. It was built about 1820, and is a -story, three bay, Federal-style frame dwelling.  It has a temple-form and pedimented gable front facade. Located behind the house is a -story frame building that housed Brownlow's Female Academy from about 1833 to 1851.

It was listed on the National Register of Historic Places in 1982.

References

Plantation houses in North Carolina
Houses on the National Register of Historic Places in North Carolina
Federal architecture in North Carolina
Houses completed in 1820
Houses in Halifax County, North Carolina
National Register of Historic Places in Halifax County, North Carolina